Gregory Segal, sometimes credited as Greg Segal, is an independent writer/director, movie producer and entertainment attorney.  He most recently directed a thriller shot in the Philippines Manila Bulletin Article, from his own script, entitled "White Knight,"   Manila Standard Article , starring Lev Gorn (The Wire, The Americans), famed pinoy character actor Mon Confiado, Leo Martinez, and FHM Cover Model and actress/dancer Lovely Abella.  He also co-wrote (with Charlotte Dianco) and directed the short film, "Chasing Lights," which stars Alexis Navarro (The Maid in London) and Matthias Rhoads (Asawa ko, karibal ko).

Career 
He has produced a number of films since 2003, including Marc Bennett's "Should've Been Romeo" starring Paul Ben Victor, Edward Asner, and Michael Rapaport, and writer-director Anthony Lover's multiple award-winning My Brother in 2006.  He produced writer-director Scott Dacko's The Insurgents in 2007, which won the German Independence Award at the Oldenburg Film Festival. He acted as a production executive on David Wain's The Ten and co-executive produced T. Sean Shannon's comedy "Harold" with City Lights Entertainment.

He was a producer on Victor Garcia's unfilmed project, Slaughter.  He is the creator and founder of the Slamdance Film Festival Horror Screenplay Competition, which the screenplay for Slaughter, written by Nathan Brookes and Bobby Lee Darby, won in January 2007.  He had a company, Angel Baby Entertainment, with former business partner John Andrew Gallagher, which was to produce Slaughter with Mark Morgan and Cheri Wozniak of Madonna and Guy Oseary's Maverick Films.

From October 2014 through September 2015, he was  president of Heretic Films.   Heretic was a production company on the films "Copenhagen" which won the Slamdance Audience Award, and on "Welcome to Me," starring Kristen Wiig, and produced with Adam McKay and Will Ferrell, as well as on "Eating Animals," based on the book by Jonathan Safran Foer and produced with Natalie Portman.

Greg was the head of business affairs for the international sales company, Entertainment 7 during 2009–2010.

Greg is also a sales agent, through his sales agency, Heat Lightning, which also does motion picture financing.

Greg is a licensed attorney.  He previously practiced tax law with Cadwalader, Wickersham and Taft.  He is a practicing attorney, now focusing on entertainment law.  He holds an M.B.A. in Accounting from Union University and has a C.P.A.  He speaks passable Chinese and in his spare time is a travel hacker living a nomadic lifestyle.

PictureStart Film Festival
Greg is the founder and director of the PictureStart Film Festival (aka the PictureStart Awards), formed in 2002 as the NYC Home Film Festival.  It is a festival for short film presented annually in New York City (formerly semi-annually).  It is now under the direction of Ben Arredondo.

References

1970 births
Living people
American film producers
People associated with Cadwalader, Wickersham & Taft
Union University alumni